Amiruddin Ahmad was a Bengali politician and jurist who served as the Governor of East Pakistan.

Early life
Amiruddin Ahmad was born on 22 December 1895 in West Bengal. He joined as the Deputy Legal Remembrancer of Bengal on 1 April 1942.

Career
He was elevated to additional judge of the Calcutta High Court on 6 January 1947. After the partition of India, he moved to East Pakistan. On 15 August 1947 was made the judge of the Dhaka High Court. He was one of three justices on the Rawalpindi conspiracy Tribunal in Hyderabad, Sindh. On 10 November 1953 he was made the chairman of the Boundary Commission. On 22 September 1954 he was made the Chief Justice of Dhaka High Court. On 14 June 1955 he was appointed Acting Governor of East Bengal. On 9 March 1956 he was appointed a judge in the Federal Court of Pakistan.

References

1895 births
Governors of East Pakistan
People of East Pakistan
Year of death missing
20th-century Bengalis
People from West Bengal